Bettney is an English surname. Notable people with the surname include:

 Julie Bettney (born 1951), Canadian educator and politician
 Chris Bettney (born 1977), English professional footballer

See also
 Bettany

English-language surnames